Adham Faramawy (ادهم فرماوي) is an artist of Egyptian descent born in Dubai, based in London. He studied at both The Slade School of Fine Art and The Royal Academy, and was affiliated with the !WOWOW! group between 2003-08. Faramawy works in digital video, print, painting, sculptural installation and computer programs.

References

External links 
 
 
 
 
 
 
 Adham Faramawy - Artist Profile on Arts Hub, July 2008
 Cork Art Trail, Ireland, 2009
 Dazeddigital, January 2011
 i-D Online, January 2011
 UnderCurrent Magazine, January 2011
 Wonderland Magazine, January 201
 Adham Faramawy's blog

1981 births
British artists
Living people
People from Dubai